LPIA most often refers to
Intel Atom (or Low-Power Intel Atom)
Late Paleozoic icehouse (also called the Late Paleozoic Ice Age)